Strain is an unincorporated community in Franklin County, in the U.S. state of Missouri.

History
A post office called Strain was established in 1903, and remained in operation until 1910. The community has the name of John M. Strain, an early settler.

References

Unincorporated communities in Franklin County, Missouri
Unincorporated communities in Missouri